The JAC Refine S4 is a Compact CUV produced by JAC Motors.

Overview

Originally launched on October 30, 2018, the Refine S4 was sold under the Refine sub-brand of JAC Motors. The Refine S4 compact crossover was positioned slightly above the Refine S3 compact crossover and below the Refine S5 compact crossover under the Refine crossover product line.

Pricing of the Refine S4 was revealed during the 2018 Guangzhou Auto Show with prices ranging from 67,800 yuan to 98,800 yuan.

The engine options of the Refine S4 crossover includes a 150 hp(110 kW)1.5 liter turbo engine and a 120 hp(88 kW)1.6 liter engine mated to either a 6-speed manual gearbox or a CVT.

The Refine S4 compact SUV is also made in Mexico from 2019 in CKD kits in the factory of Ciudad Sahagún. Mexican version was rebadged as a JAC Sei 4.

JAC iEVS4

The JAC iEVS4 is the electric version of the Refine S4, featuring the same designs with only minor differences up front.

The iEVS4 is available in three different ranges, including 355 km, 402 km, and 470 km versions. The 355 km version is equipped with a 55 kWh battery, the 402 km version is equipped with a 61 kWh battery, and the 470 km version is equipped with a 66 kWh battery.

Charging time on fast chargers are 0.75 hours for the 355 km version, 0.5 hours for the 402 km version, and 0.67 hours for the 470 km version to reach up to 80 percent of the battery charged. Charging time on standard chargers are 9.5 hours for the 355 km version, 10.5 hours for the 402 km version, and 11 hours for the 470 km version. All versions are equipped with front positioned 110 kW electric motors with a torque of 330 N-m powering the front wheels.

References

External links

Official website

Refine S4
Compact sport utility vehicles
Front-wheel-drive vehicles
2010s cars
Cars introduced in 2018
Cars of China
Production electric cars